is a former Japanese football player.

Playing career
Yoda was born in Tokyo on August 7, 1977. After graduating from Teikyo University, he joined J2 League club Montedio Yamagata in 2000. He played many matches as right side back from first season. In 2004, he moved to Japan Football League club Thespa Kusatsu. He played many matches and the club was promoted to J2 from 2005. He retired end of 2006 season.

Club statistics

References

External links

1977 births
Living people
Teikyo University alumni
Association football people from Tokyo
Japanese footballers
J2 League players
Japan Football League players
Montedio Yamagata players
Thespakusatsu Gunma players
Association football defenders